The Spartan DFS Paramotor is an American paramotor that was designed and produced by Spartan Microlights.

Design and development
The aircraft was designed to comply the US FAR 103 Ultralight Vehicles rules. It features a paraglider-style high-wing, single-place accommodation and a single  single cylinder, two-stroke air-cooled Hirth F-33 engine in pusher configuration. As is the case with all paramotors, take-off and landing is accomplished by foot.

The designation DFS stands for Dual Face System and the powerpack can be used with either a paraglider or hang glider wing.

Specifications (DFS Paramotor)

References

1990s United States ultralight aircraft
Single-engined pusher aircraft
Paramotors
Spartan Microlights aircraft